Sultana Mahdokht (died January 12, 319) was the daughter of Pholar, the Prince of Dorsas. 

Together with her brothers Adorfrowa and Mehrnarsa, Mahdokht is a canonized saint in all branches of the Church of the East due to her and her brothers' execution on January 12, 319 A.D. for leaving the Zoroastrian faith at a time when apostasy was punished by death under Shapur II. All branches of the Church of the East commemorate their feast day on January 12. They are also commemorated in the Syriac Orthodox Church. She is also the patron saint of the village of Araden, which is located in northern Iraq. The Sultana Mahdokht Church dating from the 4th century in Araden commemorates her by bearing her name (which comes ). It is a pilgrimage site for many Syriac Christians.

References

319 deaths
4th-century women
Women from the Sasanian Empire
Converts to Christianity from Zoroastrianism